Tylman van Gameren, also Tilman or Tielman and Tylman Gamerski, (Utrecht, 3 July 1632 – c. 1706, Warsaw) was a Dutch-born Polish  architect and engineer who, at the age of 28, settled in Poland and worked for Queen Marie Casimire, wife of Poland's King John III Sobieski. Tylman left behind a lifelong legacy of buildings that are regarded as gems of Polish Baroque architecture.

Life and professional career 
Tylman was born in Utrecht, the Netherlands, and was trained by Jacob van Campen whilst the latter was busy building the Stadhuis on the Dam. Like many Dutch artists at the height of the Dutch Golden Age, Tylman left for Italy in 1650. While in Venice, he earned the reputation as a highly skilled painter of battle scenes.  In 1660, Tylman met in Leiden the Polish prince Jerzy Sebastian Lubomirski, the Grand Crown Marshall of the Polish–Lithuanian Commonwealth, and accepted his invitation to come to Poland as his architect and military engineer.

Once in Warsaw, taking the name of Tylman Gamerski, he soon became a rising star at court. For his first ten years there, he served as an artillery officer, designing fortifications. From 1670 on, he won fame as a court architect of palaces such as the Pałac Czartoryskich, gardens, country houses, monasteries and churches in and around Warsaw, designing (among others) churches of the Holy Ghost, St. Casimir, and St. Boniface. His designs are known as pearls of the Polish baroque and show Italian and Dutch influences. One of the leading examples of his achievements is the Church of St. Anne in the historic centre of Kraków, modelled on Sant'Andrea della Valle in Rome. In 1676 the artist was appointed Golden Spur Knight, which allowed him to become a member of the Commonwealth society and marry Anna Komorowska. In  1685 he was formally acknowledge by the Sejm as a Polish nobleman.

He also completed the Krasiński Palace, begun in 1682 by Giuseppe Bellotti, whose sculptures were executed by Andreas Schlüter. Van Gameren left behind more than 70 grand buildings, a collection of 118 books and some 1,000 drawings.

Most of his sketches, drafts and detailed plans have been preserved and show exceptional artistic quality, though 200 of them were lost in World War II. A unique on the European scale archive of Tylman van Gameren's work, at the University of Warsaw Library, include over 800 original design drawings of ecclesiastical buildings (including the Sisters of the Holy Sacrament Church and the Bernardine Church in Czerniaków district), epitaphs, tombstones, palaces (i.e. Krasiński Palace), villas, manor houses, public service buildings and fortifications.

Tylman Gamerski died in Warsaw in 1706 and was buried in the Dominican Church on Cracow Foretown Street (unfortunately the church was pulled down in 1818 to build the Staszic Palace).

Works

See also 
Ujazdów Castle

References

Literature 
 Stanisław Mossakowski, Tilman van Gameren: Leben und Werk, Deutscher Kunstverlag, München 1994, XIII, 366 S., 
 Ottenheym, K. A., & Goossens, E. J. H. P.  (2002). "De Nederlandse jaren van Tilman van Gameren. Bronnen van inspiratie en scholing". In: E. J. Goossens & K. A. Ottenheym (eds.), Tilman van Gameren. Een Nederlandse architect aan het hof in Polen (pp. 24–39). Amsterdam: Stichting Koninklijk Paleis Amsterdam.

External links 

 Website Devoted to life and work of Tylman van Gameren
 Dutch palaces in Poland
 Tylman's Identity

1632 births
1706 deaths
Dutch Golden Age architects
Polish Baroque architects
People from Białystok
Artists from Utrecht
Dutch Baroque architects
17th-century Dutch architects